Jiří Novotný may refer to:
 Jiří Novotný (footballer), football player
 Jiří Novotný (futsal player), futsal player
 Jiří Novotný (ice hockey), ice hockey player
 Jiří Novotný (tennis), tennis player in the 1930s